The 2012–13 season are the Fajr Sepasi's 11th season in the Pro League, and their 2nd consecutive season in the top division of Iranian football and 25th year in existence as a football club. They also competed in the Hazfi Cup where they were eliminated in the quarter-finals by Damash. Fajr Sepasi was captained by Reza Haghighi until December 2012 and Mohammad Mehdi Nazari from then.

Player

First-team squad

For recent transfers, see List of Iranian football transfers winter 2012–13.

Transfers 
Confirmed transfers 2012–13

Summer

In:

Out:

Winter

In:

Out:

Competitions

Overview

Iran Pro League

Standings

Results summary

Matches summary

Pro League matches

IPL season 2012–13

Hazfi Cup matches

Round of 32

Top scorers
Includes all competitive matches. The list is sorted by shirt number when total goals are equal.

Updated on 31 January 2013

Friendlies and Pre season goals are not recognized as competitive match goals.

Coaching staff

See also
 2012–13 Iran Pro League
 2012–13 Hazfi Cup

References

External links
Iran Premier League Statistics
Persian League

Fajr Sepasi